The Straight to You Tour is the fourth concert tour by American recording artist Josh Groban. Visiting North America, Europe and Africa, the tour will support Groban's fifth studio album, Illuminations.

Background
The tour was announced by Reprise Records on Valentine's Day 2011. Initially with only three dates, many fans speculated Groban was expanding his intimate tour. Upon his 30th birthday, Groban posted a video on his Tumblr blog stating the tour's expansion in North America with additional dates in England. This is later followed by a posting on his official website with a detailed itinerary of the tour. During an interview with Gayle King, Groban mentions he still worries from time to time about his career. He further states given the current atmosphere in the entertainment industry, Groban is always worried about how the media and fans will approach an experimental sound and production. To prepare for the tour, the singer embarked on a mini tour of the United States playing theaters and concert halls. The nine city tour, entailed "Before We Begin", gave the opportunity for Groban to perform in an intimate setting and connect with the audience in new ways. Groban wants to continue the intimate theme even though he will play arenas.

To introduce the tour, Live Nation stated: "The "Straight To You" Tour will bring the feel of a theater experience to an arena setting though stage design, lighting, and projection, as well as through spontaneity and interactivity.  Groban delighted his fans during last year's 'Before We Begin' shows, in which he solicited feedback from the audience on which songs should be included in the set-list. As a result, for the 'Straight To You' shows, Groban will continue to interact with audiences and perform favorites from his best-selling albums, including his self-titled debut, Closer, and Awake, as well as songs from Illuminations."

Opening act
ELEW (North America) (select dates)

Setlist
The following songs were performed at the Toyota Center in Houston, Texas. It does not represent all songs performed on tour.
"Straight to You" (Instrumental Introduction)
"Changing Colors"
"February Song"
"You Are Loved (Don't Give Up)"
"Oceano"
"Aléjate"
"Bells of New York City"
"Higher Window"
"Alla Luce del Sole"
"War at Home"
"Instrumental Sequence"
"Você Existe em Mim"
"Caruso"
"Galileo (Someone Like You)" 
"Awake"
"Weeping"
"Machine"
"Broken Vow"
"Per Te"
Encore
"Play Me"
"You Raise Me Up"

Tour dates

Cancellations and rescheduled shows

Box office score data

References

External links
Groban's Official Website
Groban's Official Facebook Page
Groban's Official YouTube Page
Groban's Official Myspace Page

2011 concert tours
Josh Groban concert tours